Nelly Fišerová was a Czech chess master. She was Women's World Chess Championship participant (1937).

She lived in Mladá Boleslav, where in Rudolf Charousek named chess club Nelly Fišerová became for one of the leading Czechoslovak chess female players. In 1937, contrary to the decision of Czechoslovak chess federation, she participated in Women's World Chess Championship in Stockholm, where shared the 6th-7th place with Mona May Karff.

During World War II she had been repressed. In 1941 Nazi Germany authorities sent Fišerová to a concentration camp where she died.

References

Czech female chess players
Czechoslovak female chess players
Year of birth missing
1940s deaths
Year of death uncertain
Czech people who died in Nazi concentration camps
Date of birth unknown
Date of death unknown